A.W.H.Special College  is a professional college at Kallayi in Kozhikode with double affiliation to the University of Calicut and the Kerala University of Health Sciences.

Location
Near Kallayi Railway Station,
Kozhikode, Kerala, India.

Courses 
    Master of Physiotherapy (MPT)     
    Master of Social Work (MSW)      
    Master of Audiology and Speech Language Pathology (MASLP)  
    M.Sc. Audiology 
    M.Sc. Speech Language Pathology
    BPT (Bachelor of Physiotherapy)     
    Bachelor of Audiology & Speech Language Pathology (BASLP) 
    B.Sc. (Computer Science)     
    B.Sc. (Geology)     
    B.Sc. (Genetics)      
    B.Sc. (Electronics)

History
AWH Special College was established in 1996 by the Association for  Welfare of the Handicapped (AWH)
Initially the college was under the University of Calicut but in 2009 Physio therapy and Speech and Hearing courses were taken over by the Kerala University of Health Sciences.

Departments
 Physiotherapy
 Audiology and Speech Language Pathology
 Genetics
 Social Work
 Geology
 Electronics
 Computer Science

References

Universities and colleges in Kozhikode
Medical colleges in Kerala
Kozhikode
1996 establishments in Kerala
Educational institutions established in 1996